Windstorm is a 2013 German adventure film about a horse named Windstorm (German: Ostwind) directed by Katja von Garnier. It is the first movie of a series about the title giving horse. Windstorm was embodied by three different horses.

Cast 
 Hanna Binke	Mika
 Marvin Linke	Sam
 Cornelia Froboess	Maria Kaltenbach
 Tilo Prückner	Herr Kaan
 Nina Kronjäger	Elisabeth Schwarz
 Jürgen Vogel	Philipp Schwarz
 Marla Menn	Michelle
 Henriette Morawe	Tinka
 Amber Bongard	Fanny
 Detlev Buck	Tierarzt Dr. Anders
 Peter Meinhardt	Landestrainer Hessen
 Martin Butzke	Lehrer
 Simone Henn	Sanitäterin
 Neda Rahmanian	Ärztin
 Florentine Morawe	Pferdemädchen 1
 Paula Heinemann	Pferdemädchen 2
 Charline Grassnickeel	Pferdemädchen 3 (as Charline Grassnickel)
 Tim Dietrich	Pferdejunge
 Sina Müller	Kleines Mädchen im Zeltlager
 James	Ostwind
 Atila	Ostwind (wild)
Direktorca: 
Katja von Garnier 
Scenarist: 
Kristina Magdalena Henn , Lea Šmidbauer

Story 
Mika, the granddaughter of a stable owner aids a horse who does not like being feared and distrusted by gaining the trust of the horse. In that process she learns horse riding in an unconventional way. And doing so saves the horse from getting sent to a slaughterhouse

Synopsis
East wind - Together we are free is the history of bad schoolgirl Mika, which not only learns in the summer holidays, that she is a good rider, but the language of the horse speaks. For whatever reason it is the only well that can ride the previously untamed east wind, and thereby learns to love above all else. East wind is for all horse lovers, whether large or small, to highly recommend it. The story captivates until the last second. Great nature shots make the film well worth seeing as many also often dramatic twists. Can one or the other critics despise the story to this friendship as cheesy and boring, I am of the opinion that they were not allowed to experience the magic between humans and animals from their own experience in their lives.

References

External links 

2010s adventure films
Films about horses
Films directed by Katja von Garnier
German adventure films
2010s German-language films
2010s German films